This is a complete list of New York State Historic Markers in Albany County, New York.

Listings county-wide

See also

List of New York State Historic Markers
National Register of Historic Places listings in Albany County, New York
List of National Historic Landmarks in New York

References

Albany County, New York
Albany